Miniko is a village and rural commune in the Cercle of Sikasso in the Sikasso Region of southern Mali. The commune covers an area of 128 square kilometers and includes six villages. In the 2009 census it had a population of 3,288. The village of Miniko-Soba, the administrative center (chef-lieu) of the commune, is 33 km southwest of Sikasso.

References

External links
.

Communes of Sikasso Region